Aristippus may refer to:

Aristippus of Larissa, 5th century BCE Aleuadae
Aristippus (lived c. 400 BC), founder of the Cyrenaic school of philosophy
Aristippus the Younger (lived c. 325 BC), grandson of Aristippus, and also a Cyrenaic philosopher
 Aristippus, tyrant of Argos mentioned in Plutarch's Pyrrhus, who achieved power through the aid of Antigonus II Gonatas around 272 BCE; possibly grandfather of Aristippus of Argos.
Aristippus of Argos (died 235 BC), tyrant of Argos
Henry Aristippus (died 1162), medieval Sicilian translator, scholar, and courtier